East Utica is a neighborhood in the eastern section of the New York State city of Utica. The neighborhood is considered Little Italy, and it is a cultural center for Italian Americans. East Utica has historically been where most of Utica's Italian population has lived. Italian Americans make up the largest ethnic group in Utica, and at one point they accounted for over 40% of the city's population. East Utica is home to many Italian shops and restaurants, as well as residential housing and apartments. One notable business in East Utica is O’Scugnizzo’s Pizzeria, which was established in 1914 and is the second oldest pizzeria in the country. The neighborhood is home to the Rutger–Steuben Park Historic District, as well as many historic structures, such as the Byington Mill.

The 1908 New York to Paris auto race was popular in the neighborhood, with an estimated three thousand members of Utica's Italian community crowding the streets to cheer on the Brixia-Zust team, who were leading at the time.

References 
From the margin : writings in Italian Americanahttps://www.census.gov/programs-surveys/acs#:~:text=The%20American%20Community%20Survey%20(ACS,housing%20information%20about%20our%20nation.

Utica, New York
Little Italys